Magic Moments from "The Gay Life" is the twelfth studio album by American composer and arranger Nelson Riddle, consisting of music from Arthur Schwartz and Howard Dietz's musical The Gay Life.

Reception
The initial Billboard magazine review from February 17, 1962 described the album as a "tuneful mélange...the arrangements are never jarring and are sufficiently inventive and fresh sounding to add something to the original".

Track listing
All music and lyrics written by Arthur Schwartz and Howard Dietz.

Side 1

 "Magic Moment" – 2:45
 "Oh, Mein Liebchen" – 2:07
 "Why Go Anywhere at All?" – 2:45
 "Who Can? You Can?" – 2:47
 "I'm Glad I'm Single" – 2:25
 "This Kind of a Girl" – 2:26

Side 2
 "Something You Never Had Before" – 2:20
 "Come A-Wandering with Me" – 2:39
 "For the First Time" – 2:58
 "The Bloom Is Off the Rose" – 2:44
 "The Label On the Bottle" – 2:53
 "Reprise: Magic Moment, Come A-Wandering with Me, Oh Mein Liebchen, Something You Never Had Before" – 3:51

Personnel
Nelson Riddle – arranger

References

External links
 

1960 albums
Albums arranged by Nelson Riddle
Capitol Records albums
Nelson Riddle albums